The  Moses Montefiore Congregation is a synagogue in Bloomington, Illinois.

Although Jews had arrived in Bloomington by the 1850s, the synagogue was organized in 1884 and named for Sir Moses Montefiore.  In 1889 the congregation dedicated a Moorish Revival synagogue building at the southeast corner of Monroe and Prairie Streets.  It is one of the relatively few surviving 19th century synagogue buildings in the United States.

In 1959 the congregation moved to a new building in the Fairway Knolls neighborhood.   As of 1996 the original building was being used as a church.

In 2001 the building won the Adaptive Reuse Award from Landmarks Illinois.  The synagogue has been converted into a single family home.

References

External links
 
 Image
 Moses Montefiore Temple Collection, McLean County Museum of History

Synagogues in Illinois
Moorish Revival synagogues
Reform synagogues in Illinois
Synagogues completed in 1889